Fearless Records is an American independent record label that was founded in 1994. Fearless is based in Culver City, California, and is best known for its early pop punk moments captured in the Fearless Flush Sampler and Punk Bites releases, as well as additional releases by bands such as Bigwig and Dynamite Boy; and later Sugarcult; Plain White T's; The Aquabats; Amely; and post-hardcore releases by At the Drive-In and Anatomy of a Ghost.  However, the label has experimented with different styles in recent years. Acts such as Blessthefall, The Word Alive, Ice Nine Kills, Mayday Parade, Pierce The Veil, Starset, The Pretty Reckless, Underoath and The Color Morale have showcased post-hardcore, metalcore, hard rock and alternative rock bands that have emerged in recent years. Fearless Records' releases were distributed in the US by RED Distribution, but after Concord Music Group's purchase of the label in 2015, it is now distributed by Universal Music Group worldwide.

History
Bob Becker started Fearless Records when he was selling his friends records at their shows. He would also go to record stores and put their records on consignment. The record label name came from Becker not knowing what he was doing at the time and "not being afraid to jump in head first." Fearless Records was officially formed in 1994.

In 2000, Fearless Records released Punk Goes Metal, the first compilation album from the Punk Goes... series. Since then the Punk Goes... series has expanded. It has included seven Punk Goes Pop releases, two Punk Goes Acoustic releases, Punk Goes 80's and 90's, Punk Goes Crunk, Punk Goes Classic Rock, and Punk Goes X which features cover songs that were featured at the 2011 Winter X Games. Punk Goes Pop 5 was released on November 6, 2012. On January 1, 2014, Fearless Records released a video on their page on YouTube announcing bands that will be releasing albums in 2014 and also announced Fearless Records' compilation of Punk Goes 90's 2.

In 2005, Fearless Records released the studio album All That We Needed by Plain White T's, a thirteen-song collection that proved to be a breakthrough for both the label and the Illinois-based band. "Hey There Delilah", a single from that album, reached No. 1 on the Billboard Hot 100, became a success for the label and was certified as a multi-platinum single.

On November 8, 2010, Fearless announced the release of a Christmas-themed compilation album, titled 'Tis the Season to Be Fearless. It would feature eight of their signed artists recording original songs. The album was available for pre-ordering on iTunes the same day, and was released on November 22, 2010. three years later, Fearless Records released Punk Goes Christmas featuring original & cover tracks from All Time Low, ISSUES, New Found Glory, and more.

In 2011, Fearless Records released Breathe Carolina's album Hell Is What You Make It. "Blackout", a single from the album, became another success for the label. It debuted at No. 32 on the Billboard Hot 100 and was certified as a gold single.

In October 2012, Fearless Records announced that they had launched a sister label called "Old Friends Records", which would sign more indie rock artists including Hellogoodbye. In November 2013, Fearless Records announced a second imprint label called "Outerloop Records", along with their first signing Ice Nine Kills.

The label, with a back-catalog of about 150 albums, was acquired by Concord Bicycle Music in May 2015 for an estimated $10,000,000.

Artists

Current 

 The Almost
 American Teeth
 As It Is
 Archetypes Collide
 Capstan
 Chunk! No, Captain Chunk!
 Chase Atlantic
 Eat Your Heart Out
 Grayscale
 I Prevail
 Ice Nine Kills
 I Dont Know How But They Found Me
 Locket
 Movements
 My Enemies & I  
 My Kid Brother
 NOT A TOY
 Kill the Lights
 Oceans Ate Alaska
 Parting Gift
 Pierce the Veil
 Plain White T's
 The Plot in You
 The Pretty Reckless
 Set It Off
 Starset
 Underoath
 Until I Wake
 Varials
 Volumes
 Windwaker
 Wage War

Old Friends Records artists
  Carousel
 Hellogoodbye
 The Static Jacks
  Wild Party

Former 

 30 Foot Fall 
 Alesana 
 The Almighty Trigger Happy
 Anatomy of a Ghost 
 Amely 
 The Aquabats 
 Artist vs. Poet 
 August Burns Red 
 A Skylit Drive 
 A Static Lullaby 
 At the Drive-In 
 Bazookas Go Bang!  
 Beefcake 
 Bickley 
 Bigwig 
 Blessthefall 
 Blount 
 Brazil 
 Breathe Carolina 
 Brightwell 
 Chuck
 Classic Case
 The Color Morale 
 Cruiserweight 
 Dead Lazlo's Place
 The Downtown Fiction 
 Drunk In Public
 Dynamite Boy 
 Every Avenue 
 Eve 6 
 Eye Alaska 
 Family Values
 Fed Up
 Follow My Lead 
 For All Those Sleeping 
 Forever the Sickest Kids 
 The Fully Down 
 Gatsbys American Dream 
 Get Scared 
 Glasseater 
 Glue Gun
 Gob 
 Go Radio
 Grabbers
 Invisible Boss
 Jason Lancaster
 Junction 18
 Jakiro
 Keepsake
 The Killing Moon
 The Kinison
 Knockout
 Let's Get It
 Logan Square
 Lonely Kings 
 Lostprophets 
 The Maine 
 Mayday Parade 
 Milestones 
 The Morning Light
 Motionless in White 
 Motherfist
 Near Miss 
 Nipdrivers
 The Outline 
 Patton Thomas
 Portugal. The Man 
 Real Friends 
 Red Fish
 Rock Kills Kid 
 RPM
 So They Say
 Sparks the Rescue 
 Starset 
 The Starting Line
 Straight Faced
 Sugarcult 
 Superman Please Don't
 The Summer Set 
 Sworn In (disbanded)
 Tonight Alive 
 Upon This Dawning 
 The White Noise 
 The Word Alive 
 Whitekaps (also known as White Caps)
 Yesterdays Rising

Discography

See also 
 List of record labels

References

External links 
 
 Punknews.org Entry on Fearless Records

Record labels established in 1994
1994 establishments in California
Record labels based in California
Companies based in Culver City, California
Rock record labels
Alternative rock record labels
Punk record labels
Pop record labels
Heavy metal record labels
Post-hardcore record labels